Sandia Pueblo is a station on the New Mexico Rail Runner Express commuter rail line. The station opened on August 29, 2011.

It is located near the Sandia Pueblo on NM Highway 313 just off Roy Avenue.

Each of the stations contains an icon to express each community's identity. The icon representing this station is a hummingbird, which is important to the Sandia people. It is one of a number of birds that is significant for its beauty and the goodwill that it carries.  It is sometimes mentioned in songs and prayers.

References

External links
Stations, Sandia Pueblo Official Rail Runner site

Railway stations in New Mexico
Railway stations in the United States opened in 2011